Gwendoline Lindiwe "Gwen" Mahlangu-Nkabinde (born 16 August 1955) is a South African politician who was Speaker of the National Assembly of South Africa from 2008 to 2009. She became Deputy Speaker on 23 April 2004 and was later elected as Speaker on 25 September 2008; in the latter post, she succeeded Baleka Mbete, who was appointed as Deputy President of South Africa, and Mahlangu-Nkabinde was in turn succeeded as Deputy Speaker by former Deputy Health Minister Nozizwe Madlala-Routledge. Following the April 2009 general election, she was replaced as Speaker by Max Sisulu on 6 May 2009.

She was appointed Minister of Public Works on 1 November 2010 until she was replaced for her role in the Police lease scandal in 2011. Prior to that, she had served as Deputy Minister of Economic Development from 11 May 2009 to 30 October 2010.

Other positions

Current
 Chairperson, Disciplinary Committee of the National Assembly

Former
 Chairperson, Portfolio Committee on Environmental Affairs and Tourism
 Vice-President, Inter-Parliamentary Union (IPU) Co-ordinating Committee of Women Parliamentarians
 executive member of the IPU
 President of GLOBE (The Global Legislators Organisation) Southern Africa (2002–2004)
 Co-President Stakeholder Forum for a Sustainable Future (2001-2005)

References

Living people
African National Congress politicians
Speakers of the National Assembly of South Africa
1955 births
Women members of the National Assembly of South Africa
Members of the National Assembly of South Africa